David Allan Edstrom (September 10, 1938 – May 9, 2019) was a decathlete from the United States. He won the gold medal in the men's decathlon event at the 1959 Pan American Games in Chicago. He represented his native country at the 1960 Summer Olympics. He competed for Sherwood High School (Oregon), the University of Oregon, the Emerald Empire TC, the Oregon TC, and the US Air Force. He had six children.

References

1938 births
2019 deaths
American male decathletes
Athletes (track and field) at the 1959 Pan American Games
Athletes (track and field) at the 1960 Summer Olympics
Olympic track and field athletes of the United States
Oregon Ducks men's track and field athletes
Track and field athletes from Portland, Oregon
Pan American Games gold medalists for the United States
Pan American Games medalists in athletics (track and field)
People from Sherwood, Oregon
Medalists at the 1959 Pan American Games